Starling Bank is a British bank, often referred to as a digital challenger bank or neobank, providing current and business bank accounts in the United Kingdom. Starling Bank is a licensed and regulated bank, founded by former Allied Irish Banks COO, Anne Boden, in January 2014. Since its founding, it has received over £500m of funding. The company received its banking licence from the Prudential Regulation Authority and the Financial Conduct Authority in July 2016.

History

Starling Bank is a digital challenger bank that was founded by British entrepreneur Anne Boden in 2014. The bank offers a range of personal and business banking services through its mobile app, including personal current accounts, joint accounts, business accounts, and Euro accounts, amongst other services. With a focus on technology and user experience, Starling Bank has become an alternative to traditional high-street banks. The bank is headquartered in London, United Kingdom and is authorised by the Prudential Regulation Authority and regulated by the Financial Conduct Authority and the Prudential Regulation Authority. 

In 2016, Starling raised £48 million. In February 2019 Starling raised £75m from Merian Global Investors. The following week, the company announced it had raised £100m from the Capability and Innovation Fund in the form of grant funding. The company launched its beta in March 2017. In March 2018, Starling launched business accounts. In February 2019, Starling launched personal Euro accounts in the UK. Founder Anne Boden announced in December 2017 that the bank intended to apply for the RBS Remedies Fund. In March 2021, Starling announced a £272m funding round, with investors including Fidelity, the Qatar Investment Authority and Millennium Management.
The bank has partnered with other companies to offer some of its services. In March 2017 Starling began to use of TransferWise to process international payments. In November 2018, the company partnered with the Post Office to allow Starling account holders to deposit and withdraw funds at any Post Office branch. In late 2020, The Times reported that larger banks were looking at acquiring Starling. The CEO of Starling denied the reports and stated they aimed for an initial public offering by 2022.

Locations 
Starling does not have physical branches. The company has offices in London, Cardiff and Southampton. For customers who want to deposit cash into their accounts, Starling Bank has partnered with Post Offices and other designated locations across the UK.

Cards 
Starling Bank offers a contactless Debit Mastercard. As of September 2019, Starling cards were not part of the LINK network. Starling changed the design of its cards in July 2018, to a vertical card design coloured teal and navy. In March 2021, Starling announced their new and replacement debit cards would be made from 75% of recycled rigid PVC plastic.

In addition to physical cards, Starling Bank also offers its customers the ability to create multiple virtual cards within the app. These virtual cards can be used for online purchases and can be set up. Customers can also set limits, block and unblock their virtual cards for security and control. The ability to create multiple virtual cards allows customers to easily separate their spending into different categories, such as entertainment, groceries, or travel, making it easier to track spending.

Mobile apps 
In 2017, Starling claimed to be the first UK bank to support in-app setup for Apple Pay. The features of Starling's mobile apps include instant notifications of transactions, freezing and unfreezing customers' cards to prevent unauthorised transactions, categorising transactions for later analysis, creating separate "goals" where money can be stored separately to a customer's main balance, and in-app chat with customer service representatives. The bank also offers a 'Settle Up' feature, where customers can send money to their contacts. The app also features real-time notifications and spending insights, aiding customers in making informed financial decisions. The focus on technology and user experience has been a key differentiator for Starling Bank. The bank primarily serves customers via mobile banking apps on iOS and Android.

Awards
Starling Bank received the Best British Bank award in the British Bank Awards for five consecutive years – 2018 to 2022.

Senior leadership 

 Chief Executive: Anne Boden (since 2014)
 Chairman: David Sproul (since 2021)

References

External links
 

Banks of the United Kingdom
Banks
Banks based in the City of London
Online banks
Banks established in 2014